Spider-Man: The Manga is a Japanese manga written by Kōsei Ono and Kazumasa Hirai and illustrated by Ryoichi Ikegami which retold the story of Spider-Man in a Japanese setting. It was originally published in Japan from January 1970 to September 1971 in Monthly Shōnen Magazine. The comic began as mostly a translation of American Marvel stories, but over time, Ikegami introduced more original material. The manga features Yu Komori as Spider-Man's teen alter ego, and takes place in a Japanese setting.

Premise
A junior high school student named : A bright and intellectually-gifted, yet outcasted and withdrawn teen genius, is bitten by a radioactive spider during a scientific demonstration, which imbues him with spider-like superhuman abilities, like the American Spider-Man's counterpart, Peter Parker and after a tragic mistake committed by accidentally mis-using his powers, which results in him unintentionally killing someone, a guilt-ridden Yu is driven to do good and atone for his irresponsibility, under the alias of a masked vigilante: "Spider-Man". Yu faces Japanese versions of villains such as Electro, the Lizard, Mysterio, and the Kangaroo. The series also featured counterparts of Aunt May, named "Mei", and J. Jonah Jameson, who is the publisher of the newspaper publishing company, where Yu is employed as a freelance photographer and which has an anti-Spider-Man stance.

Publication
Initially, Kōsei Ono wrote the stories. On completion of the sixth story, Kazumasa Hirai became the writer.  Ikegami continued to provide the art. The first few stories featured analogues to several of Spider-Man's villains and supporting cast, while maintaining an altogether darker, grittier and moodier tone and atmosphere, compared to the original Spider-Man comics. The later Hirai-written stories deviated further from the source material, being more tonally mature, adult-oriented, violent, while including obscene content, 
such as profanity, sexual and gruesome imagery of a kind not seen in the original American Spider-Man comics. The later stories involved less comedy, were more dramatic, and had more realistic art, reflecting Ikegami's later style. The majority of the manga's stories focused on Yu's struggles with his alter-ego as Spider-Man and his normal life as a high school student, the negative sides and consequences being a super-powered vigilante brings on to his life, along with his character-arc of initially utilizing his powers for solely selfish gain, to using them to do good and for genuinely altruistic reasons, out of a sense of responsibility, despite being constantly tormented by negative emotions and the burden and misery being Spider-Man brings on to him, while also being careful with the use of his spider-powers and controlling his darker side and grim thoughts regarding his life as Spider-Man and struggling with the increasing tension being a masked vigilante brings on to his relationships with his close ones, being extremely similar with the original Stan Lee/Steve Ditko run on the Amazing Spider-Man comics.

The books were reprinted in their original format, with the original Japanese text, in 1974, 1976, 1996 and 2006. The covers were updated, with the first three reprints to feature a picture of Spider-Man holding a flower. This image was originally a foldout 1971 calendar included with the original monthly printings. A number on a bottom-left of the cover indicated the story arc reprinted within.

The English-language version of the series was reprinted by Marvel Comics across thirty-one issues from December 1997 to April 1999. Eight out of the thirteen Japanese stories in total were fully translated, with several edits to remove some of the violent scenes. The final issue, #31, began the translation of the ninth story and was left incomplete due to the title's cancellation.

Stories 
 "The Birth of Spider-Man" (reprinted in Spider-Man: The Manga #1-3)
 "The Transformation of Doctor Inumaru" (reprinted in Spider-Man: The Manga #4-6)
 "Too Strong a Hero" (reprinted in Spider-Man: The Manga #7-9)
 "The False Spider-Man" (reprinted in Spider-Man: The Manga #10-15)
 "Yu Under Suspicion" (reprinted in Spider-Man: The Manga #16-18)
 "Summer of Insanity" (reprinted Spider-Man: The Manga #19-21)
 "What is My Destination!"
 "Woman of Winter" (reprinted in Spider-Man: The Manga #22-24)
 "Strangers" (reprinted in Spider-Man: The Manga #31)
 "The Mania Demon"
 "Shadow of Spider-Man" (reprinted in Spider-Man: The Manga #25-30)
 "Witch of the Golden Eye"
 "The Woman Who Raises the Tiger"

Volumes

Original release (Sun Comics (Asahi Sonorama))

1986 - 1987 release (Sun Wide Comics (Asahi Sonorama))

1995 - 1996 release (Asahi Sonorama)

2002 release (MF Bunko (Media Factory))

2004 release (MF Comics (Media Factory))

In other media
 Spider-Man: The Manga is now considered canon in the Marvel Multiverse, and is designated as having taken place on Earth-70091. During the Spider-Verse crossover, Komori is explicitly named as one of "four or five Japanese Spider-Men" taking part in the final battle against Morlun and the Inheritors.

See also
 Hulk: The Manga
 X-Men: The Manga
 Spider-Man J
 Japanese Spider-Man

References

External links

Kazumasa Hirai (author)
Ryoichi Ikegami
Shōnen manga
Spider-Man titles
Superheroes in anime and manga
Manga based on comics
Gekiga